A Lie of Reinvention: Correcting Manning Marable's Malcolm X is a collection of essays related to Malcolm X: A Life of Reinvention by Manning Marable. It is edited by Jared Ball and Todd Steven Burroughs.

Ball has stated that Marable's book “is a corporate product, a simple commodity to be traded, but for more than money; it is a carefully constructed ideological assault on history, on radical politics, on historical and cultural memory, on the very idea of revolution.”

Notes

External links

 Black Classic Books
 Black Agenda Report

2012 non-fiction books
Works about Malcolm X